Gymir may refer to:
Ægir, a jötunn whose names include Gymir in Norse mythology
Gymir (father of Gerðr), a jötunn who may or may not be the same figure as the above in Norse mythology